Winkelmann or Winkelman is a German and Jewish surname that referred to someone who either lived at a corner or owned a shop there. It is the surname of:

 Christian Herman Winkelmann, bishop of the Roman Catholic Diocese of Wichita (1939–1946)
 Eduard Winkelmann (1838–1896), German historian
 Helen Winkelmann (born 1962), current chief justice of New Zealand 
 Hermann Winkelmann (1849–1912), German heldentenor
 Johann Just Winkelmann (1620–1699)
 Maria Margarethe Winckelmann (1670–1720), German astronomer known as Maria Margarethe Kirch (née Winckelmann) 
 Stephan Winkelmann (b. 1964), CEO of Lamborghini

Winkelman is the surname of:

 Babe Winkelman, American professional fisherman
 Bobby Winkelman, American guitarist 
 Brett Winkelman (b. 1986), American basketball player
 Henri Winkelman (1876–1952), Dutch General
 Jane Winkelman (b. 1949), American Painter
 Joshua Winkelman (b. 1970), better known as Josh Wink, American electronic musician
 Pete Winkelman, Chairman of Milton Keynes Dons FC
 Willem Winkelman (1887–1990), Dutch athlete
 Heide Winkelman, (b. 1989), Founder of New York based witchcraft support group Upstate Witches Society, intuitive tarot reader

See also 
Winkleman
 Winckelmann (disambiguation)

References

German-language surnames